Cham Rastamian (also Romanized as Cham Rastamīān) is a village in Jayedar Rural District, in the Central District of Pol-e Dokhtar County, Lorestan Province, Iran. At the 2006 census, its population was 46, in 8 families.

References 

Towns and villages in Pol-e Dokhtar County